Richard J. Skrenta Jr. (born June 6, 1967) is an American computer programmer and Silicon Valley entrepreneur who created the web search engine blekko.

Biography
Richard J. Skrenta Jr. was born  in Pittsburgh on June 6, 1967. In 1982, at age 15, as a high school student at Mt. Lebanon High School, Skrenta wrote the Elk Cloner virus that infected Apple II machines. It is widely believed to have been one of the first large-scale self-spreading personal computer viruses ever created.

In 1989, Skrenta graduated with a B.A. in computer science from Northwestern University.

Between 1989 and 1991, Skrenta worked at Commodore Business Machines with Amiga Unix.

In 1989, Skrenta started working on a multiplayer simulation game. In 1994, it was launched under the name Olympia as a pay-for-play PBEM game by Shadow Island Games.

Between 1991 and 1995, Skrenta worked at Unix System Labs, and from 1996 to 1998 with IP-level encryption at Sun Microsystems. He later left Sun and became one of the founders of DMOZ. He stayed on board after the Netscape acquisition, and continued to work on the directory as well as Netscape Search, AOL Music, and AOL Shopping.

After his stint at AOL, Skrenta went on to cofound Topix LLC, a Web 2.0 company in the news aggregation and forums market.

In 2005, Skrenta and his fellow cofounders sold a 75% share of Topix to a newspaper consortium made up of Tribune, Gannett, and Knight Ridder.

In the late 2000s, Skrenta headed the startup company Blekko Inc, which was an Internet search engine. Blekko received early investment support from Marc Andreessen and began public beta testing on November 1, 2010.

In 2015, IBM acquired both the Blekko company and search engine for their Watson computer system.

Skrenta was involved in the development of VMS Monster, an old MUD for VMS. VMS Monster was part of the inspiration for TinyMUD. He is also known for his role in developing TASS, an ancestor of tin, the popular threaded Usenet newsreader for Unix systems.

References

External links
Skrenta.com

American computer programmers
MUD developers
1967 births
Living people
Northwestern University alumni
People from Mt. Lebanon, Pennsylvania
DMOZ

sv:Rich Skrenta